Holly State Recreation Area is a state recreation area in Groveland Township, near Holly, Michigan.

Park Information
Covering  of rolling woodland and open fields, the park area is bisected by Dixie Highway and Interstate 75, with a majority of park features to the east, and the Holdbridge Lakes Mountain Bike Area to the west, featuring the Gruber's Grinder trail.  Features include an 18-hole disc golf course,  of hiking and mountain biking trails, a model airplane flying field, opportunities for swimming, fishing, boating, and hunting.  Winter activities include cross-country skiing and snowmobiling. Camping is provided for at 160 campsites and 3 rustic cabins, one of which is the Rolston Cabin. There is a groomed beach with picnic tables, a snack bar, and boat rentals on Heron Lake.  The park area also encompasses McGinnis Lake, Valley Lake, and Wildwood Lake.

The park typically sees the highest number of visitors in August and September, coinciding with the Michigan Renaissance Festival, which is located near the park.

The area is managed by the Michigan Department of Natural Resources.

Gallery

See also
Seven Lakes State Park, a nearby state park

External links
Holly Recreation Area Michigan Department of Natural Resources
Holly Game Unit of Holly Recreation Area Protected Planet (World Database on Protected Areas)

Protected areas of Oakland County, Michigan
State recreation areas of Michigan